

Administrative and municipal divisions

References

Kirov Oblast
Kirov Oblast